Speedball is one of the three distinct game variants in the sport of paintball, along with woodsball and scenario paintball.

It is a general term for a game in which the playing field is composed of bunkers, of the same location and number on each side of the field, that provide an equal playing field for each team competing.  It was created in this way to give a better format for competitive paintball, both in playing and viewing the games.

General 
Paintball is one of the most widely played extreme sports in the United States. Due to the popularity of the speedball variant in professional paintball leagues, speedball evolved paintball into a more formalized game, with each league having a differing format.  Paintball was originally a recreational activity, but became a sport with the advent of organized speedball tournaments, professional teams making use of coaching, corporate endorsements, media coverage, and fan followings.

(Paintball actually became a sport in the 1990s with a world cup, governing bodies and international leagues and cup tournaments.  There was even a Speedball tournament held annually.)

History 

During the 1980s and 90s, tournament paintball was played strictly in the woods. Because of different terrains the playing field was different at every park.  However, a popular playing field in Southern California called SC Village featured a field bereft of trees or natural cover and just contained roofless plywood buildings in the late '80s. However, there was a large water-filled lagoon right in the middle of the field. It was aimed at making the game more spectator-friendly. The term now encompasses just about any game where you start within shooting distance of the opposing team. This was the favorite of many players because of its fast paced action. This is what started a new format of paintball that became known as speedball, because of its speed.  The field was tweaked and worked with to adjust to players' liking until 1996 when the first fully inflatable field was unveiled by Brass Eagle. Because of the ability to transport and reconfigure inflatable bunkers, and the lower potential for injury due to players colliding with them, this type of field would eventually become the standard field type for most tournament paintball leagues in North America.

Game play 

Speedball is a team sport, and can be played recreationally or professionally, with games usually specifying teams of three, five, seven, or ten.  The game is characterized by a small symmetrical playing field, with obstacles (such as inflatable bunkers) placed in various configurations to challenge players, and various game times. The PSP, for example, has varying time limits depending on the division. Stealth and concealment is of little use on a speedball field; there is very little to blend in with. Success is dependent upon teamwork, aggressive movement, and constant communication.  Players wear uniforms, similar to more traditional sports.

Speedball leagues specify the points system to be used for games.  For example, in the NPPL's opposing flag format, points are awarded for staying in the game the whole round, shooting someone out, grabbing the flag, and hanging the flag.  PSP uses the Race2 format, where a match between two teams involves multiple games of center flag; there is a flag in the center of the field, and a team is awarded a point every time the flag is captured and hung on the opposing team's start box. Teams can play to a certain number of points, or to a set time limit.

Because of the small size, generally less than 20,000 square feet, and openness of the field, proper positioning combined with restricting movement is a primary element of speedball tactics; the team who is better able to keep their opponents pinned behind cover while they themselves are free to move will have an enormous advantage. Therefore, the number of shots fired by each player is significantly higher than in woodsball games.

Leagues 

There are a variety of paintball leagues that employ speedball as their format for tournaments. The main national league in the US is the NXL (National X-Ball League). The 7-man format run by the NPPL (National Professional Paintball League) has had numerous attempts to be a viable league but haven't had the stability to maintain a constant season. The Millennium Series is Europe's national league and features rules and styles of game play similar to that of the PSP, NPPL and LAPPL.

Sponsorships, television endorsements, extensive media coverage, and nationwide events have all pushed the leagues into mainstream popularity.  In 2007, at World Cup, the most popular PSP event located at Disney’s Wide World of Sports Complex, boasted over 35,000 spectators and featured 373 teams. There are also numerous regional and local events all over the world, including most paintball fields which many times host their own events.

Markers 

Speedball paintball markers are designed to be small so they do not present a large target; in virtually all tournament rule sets, a player is eliminated if they, or anything they are wearing or holding including their marker, is hit. Tournaments also specify allowable firing modes and rates of fire. For instance, PSP league rules place a 10.2  (balls per second) limit or "cap" on rate of fire, but allow a marker to "ramp" (shoot additional shots per trigger pull) when the trigger is pulled rapidly. In the NPPL, paintball markers may not fire over 15  and the firing mode is semi-automatic (one shot per trigger pull). The circuitry of modern electro-pneumatic markers generally incorporates specific firing modes that follow each league's basic rules. Beyond regulations to rate of fire, some paintball markers use anti-chop "eyes" to prevent the marker firing without a paintball securely seated in the chamber. This ensures that a paintball, which has only fed halfway, is not "chopped" in half as the bolt closes the chamber, which will affect accuracy of subsequent shots due to paintball fragments left in the chamber and barrel.

Modern speedball markers tend to be electro-pneumatic in design, and run off compressed air or nitrogen.  Slightly older models of speedball guns used to run mechanically, but higher rates of fire could not be reached due to longer trigger pulls and heavier pull weights.  Electronic markers replaced the often heavy and long pull of a mechanical trigger, needed to manipulate the mechanical linkage to the firing mechanism, with a simple electronic button or other sensor that detects a trigger pull. As a result, electro-pneumatic markers' trigger pulls are often measured in millimeters of travel and just a few grams of pull weight, allowing for very fast rates of fire using various techniques of "walking" the trigger (alternating pulling the trigger with index and middle fingers).

The technology of speedball markers has been advancing over time. Every year companies make guns more consistent, accurate, reliable and convenient. Although this technology can become costly, some players are willing to invest large amounts of money into their markers. The advancement of technology in markers also means that less-expensive technologies, usually based around the circuitry of a marker, can be integrated into lower-cost markers, making entry-level speedball markers very competitive in many ways to higher-cost models. Also, as markers become more advanced, hoppers must also be able to keep up with the achievable high rates of fire.

See also 
 Player positions (paintball)

References 

Paintball variants